Tullabracky is a civil parish and townland in County Limerick, Ireland.

References

Civil parishes of County Limerick
Townlands of County Limerick
Church of Ireland parishes in the Republic of Ireland